Ahmad Al-Omaier (born 17 April 1983), commonly known as Ahmad Omaier, is a Syrian footballer who plays for Al-Karamah in Syrian Premier League.

International career
Omaier was a member of the Syria national football team from 2003 until 2011.

Goals for Senior National Team
Scores and results table. Syria's goal tally first:

Awards and honours

Club

Al-Jaish
Syrian Premier League: 2002–03
Syrian Cup: 2003–04
AFC Cup: 2004
Al-Karamah
Asian Champions League: 2006 Runner-up

References

External links
 
 
 

1983 births
Living people
Sportspeople from Homs
Syrian footballers
Syria international footballers
Syrian expatriate footballers
Association football forwards
Al-Karamah players
Al-Jaish Damascus players
Taliya SC players
Al-Ramtha SC players
Al-Wahda SC (Syria) players
Sur SC players
Oman Professional League players
Expatriate footballers in Kuwait
Syrian expatriate sportspeople in Kuwait
Expatriate footballers in Jordan
Syrian expatriate sportspeople in Jordan
Expatriate footballers in Lebanon
Syrian expatriate sportspeople in Lebanon
Expatriate footballers in Iraq
Syrian expatriate sportspeople in Iraq
Expatriate footballers in Oman
Syrian expatriate sportspeople in Oman
Safa SC players
Lebanese Premier League players
Syrian Premier League players
Al-Fahaheel FC players
Kuwait Premier League players